Tarzan's Treehouse is a treetop walk-through attraction at Hong Kong Disneyland and formerly at Disneyland in California. It is based on Disney's 1999 film Tarzan.

Disneyland version
In February 1999, Disneyland closed its version of the Swiss Family Treehouse, and Imagineers re-themed the attraction to coincide with the soon-to-be released Tarzan film. The giant artificial tree received a comprehensive makeover, including 6,000 replacement vinyl leaves, a suspension bridge from a new entrance via a new neighboring tree, and a variety of hands-on interactive features. The tree was 80 feet tall, weighed 150 tons, and contained a total of 300,000 vinyl leaves.

On June 23, 1999, Tarzan's Treehouse opened to park guests, just as Disney's animated Tarzan premiered in movie theaters. Tributes to the Swiss Family Treehouse were featured in the attraction including the "Mind Thy Head" sign and the "Swisskapolka", which could be heard playing on a vintage gramophone.

In November 2019, a wooden plank of the bridge into Tarzan's Treehouse snapped prompting the attraction to close for a short period for repairs.

On September 3, 2021, the attraction closed for refurbishment, and demolition of the bridge and entrance tree began in April 2022. The original tree is planned to re-open with a new name and theme. In November 2022, it was announced that the treehouse will reopen in 2023 as the Adventureland Treehouse, inspired by Disney's Swiss Family Robinson (1960).

Hong Kong Disneyland version
When Hong Kong Disneyland opened on September 12, 2005, it included Tarzan's Treehouse built on Tarzan's Island. Rafts near Festival of the Lion King are used to ferry passengers to and from the island, which is encircled by the Rivers of Adventure. This is a similar arrangement to Disneyland's Tom Sawyer Island.

Gallery

Further reading
Theme Park Adventure, Special Tarzan's Treehouse issue, 2000.

References

Tarzan (franchise)
Walt Disney Parks and Resorts attractions
Disneyland
Hong Kong Disneyland
Adventureland (Disney)
Fictional trees
Fictional houses
Artificial trees
Amusement rides introduced in 1999
Amusement rides introduced in 2005
1999 establishments in California
2021 disestablishments in California 
2005 establishments in Hong Kong